Mellij Galleh (also Romanized as Mellīj Galleh; also known as Malīk Kāleh and Mellī Galleh) is a village in Mehravan Rural District, in the Central District of Neka County, Mazandaran Province, Iran. At the 2006 census, its population was 185, in 46 families.

References 

Populated places in Neka County